Robert W. R. Tamplin (1928 – 13 February 2017) was an Irish rower. He competed in the men's eight event at the 1948 Summer Olympics.

References

External links
 

1928 births
2017 deaths
Irish male rowers
Olympic rowers of Ireland
Rowers at the 1948 Summer Olympics